This is a list of Turkish musicians, musicians born in Turkey or who have Turkish citizenship or residency.

0-9
3 Hür-El

A
Muazzez Abacı
Cem Adrian
Esin Afşar
Barış Akarsu
Muhlis Akarsu
Sezen Aksu
Ayten Alpman
Rojda Aykoç
Demet Akalın
Behiye Aksoy
Alişan
Funda Arar
Aylin Aslım
Athena (group)
Atiye
Aynur Aydın
Emre Aydın
Güliz Ayla
Safiye Ayla
Aydilge
Ayna

B 
Selda Bağcan
Bedük
Bengü
Bergen
Berkant
Semiha Berksoy
Ümit Besen
Ali Rıza Binboğa
İdil Biret
Can Bonomo
Murat Boz
Buray
Erol Büyükburç

C 
Sibel Can
Koray Candemir
Cartel
Mustafa Ceceli
Hayko Cepkin
Ceza
Cici Kızlar (group)

Ç 
Ayla Çelik
Yavuz Çetin
Ali Ekber Çiçek
Nesimi Çimen

D 
Murat Dalkılıç
Demir Demirkan
Özcan Deniz
İrem Derici
Ayla Dikmen
Petek Dinçöz
Kenan Doğulu
Güler Duman
Beyza Durmaz
Nükhet Duru
Duman (band) (group)

E 
Arzu Ece
Edis
Rafet El Roman
Ahmet Enes
Sibel Egemen
Emrah
Esin Engin
Candan Erçetin
Bengü Erden
Erol Erdinç
Ersan Erdura
Sertab Erener
Gülben Ergen
İbrahim Erkal
Fatih Erkoç
Ersen ve Dadaşlar
Bülent Ersoy
Metin Ersoy
Muazzez Ersoy
Neşet Ertaş
Ceylan Ertem
Esmeray
Yonca Evcimik
Erol Evgin
Ezhel

F 
Şebnem Ferah

G 
Gazapizm
Orhan Gencebay
Leyla Gencer
Tülay German
Ferhat Göçer
Gökçe
Göksel
Grup Gündoğarken (group)
Gülşen
Ebru Gündeş
Burcu Güneş
Aslı Güngör
Seden Gürel
Müslüm Gürses

H 
Hadise
Nuray Hafiftaş
Rober Hatemo
Hepsi
Hümeyra

İ 
İlhan İrem
İzel

J 
Emina Jahović
Juanito

K 
Gülçin Yahya Kaçar
Sagopa Kajmer
Yıldız Kaplan
Gülden Karaböcek
Neşe Karaböcek
Cem Karaca
Işın Karaca
Reyhan Karaca
Nil Karaibrahimgil
Kayahan
Keremcem
Kibariye
Kıraç
Mahsun Kırmızıgül
Gökhan Kırdar
Fikret Kızılok
Klips ve Onlar (group)
Erkin Koray
Kurban (group)
Burak Kut

L 
Zülfü Livaneli
Apolas Lermi

M 
Barış Manço
maNga (group)
Mabel Matiz
MFÖ (group)
Modern Folk Üçlüsü (group)
Moğollar (group)
Mor ve Ötesi (group)
Darío Moreno
Hasan Mutlucan
Zeki Müren

N 
Nazlı
Nez
Nilüfer
Nükleer Başlıklı Kız

O 
Erkan Oğur
Tanju Okan
Zuhal Olcay
Serdar Ortaç
Bülent Ortaçgil

Ö 
Ayşe Hatun Önal
Füsun Önal
Nazan Öncel
Merve Özbey
Soner Özbilen
Zerrin Özer
Ahmet Özhan

P 
Şebnem Paker
Pamela
Ajda Pekkan
Sibil Pektorosoğlu
Pentagram (Mezarkabul) (group)
Romalı Perihan

R 
Nükhet Ruacan

S
Ziynet Sali
Yeşim Salkım
Leman Sam
Şevval Sam
Mustafa Sandal
Soner Sarıkabadayı
Seda Sayan
Emel Sayın
Ece Seçkin
Deniz Seki
Müzeyyen Senar
Silüetler (group)
Simge
Nesrin Sipahi
Sıla
Ruhi Su

Ş 
Timuçin Şahin
Aşık Veysel Şatıroğlu
Şenay
Adnan Şenses
Aşık Mahzuni Şerif

T 
Seyyal Taner
Tarkan
Atilla Taş
İbrahim Tatlıses
Ferdi Tayfur
Selçuk Tekay
Başak Tekçe 
Özlem Tekin
Teoman
Yıldız Tilbe
Aleyna Tilki
Arto Tunç
Onno Tunç
Nida Tüfekçi
Sibel Tüzün
TPAO Batman (group)

U 
Derya Uluğ

V 
Vega (group)

Y 
Yalın
Semiha Yankı
Ebru Yaşar
Gönül Yazar
Hande Yener
Aşkın Nur Yengi
Yeni Türkü (group)
İsmail YK
Tuğba Yurt
Işıl Yücesoy
Levent Yüksel
Şenay Yüzbaşıoğlu

Z 
Zakkum (group)
Zara

See also
Music of Turkey

References

 
Turkish